Sławomir Maciejowski (16 January 1951 – 4 January 2023) was a Polish rower. He competed in the men's eight event at the 1972 Summer Olympics.

Maciejowski died on 4 January 2023, at the age of 71.

References

1951 births
2023 deaths
Polish male rowers
Olympic rowers of Poland
Rowers at the 1972 Summer Olympics
Sportspeople from Płock